Jiangling may refer to:

Places
Jiangling County (江陵县), a county under the jurisdiction of Jingzhou City, China
Jiangling (江陵), a historical name of Jingzhou, Hubei, China

Companies

Jiangling Motors (江铃汽车 or 江铃股份), Chinese automobile manufacturer
JMCG (江铃集团), Chinese state-owned automotive company
Jiangling Holdings (江铃控股), Chinese automotive joint venture